Fonds-Saint-Denis is a village and commune in the French overseas department and region, and island, of Martinique. It is the smallest commune of the island.

Geography

Climate
Fonds-Saint-Denis has a tropical rainforest climate (Köppen climate classification Af).

See also
Communes of Martinique

References

External links

Communes of Martinique
Populated places in Martinique